FC Silon Táborsko is a football club located in Tábor, Czech Republic. It plays in the Czech National Football League (2nd tier).

History
The club was formerly located at Soukenik stadium in nearby Sezimovo Ústí. Lower squads of the team, as well the youth teams still play their games there. In June 2011, FK Spartak MAS Sezimovo Ústí owner Jiří Smrž bought the rights to neighbouring team FK Tábor and at the end of 2011, the club announced that they would compete from 2012, including the remainder of the season in progress, as FC MAS Táborsko.

In 2022, the club got a new main sponsor and changed its name to FC Silon Táborsko.

Historical names
 ?–2011: FK Spartak MAS Sezimovo Ústí
 2012–2022: FC MAS Táborsko
 2022–: FC Silon Táborsko

Players

Current squad
.

Out on loan

Notable former players

Honours
Bohemian Football League (third tier)
 Champions: 2009–10

References

External links
 

 
Football clubs in the Czech Republic
Association football clubs established in 2012
2012 establishments in the Czech Republic
Sport in Tábor